Ahmad Mustain bin Othman is a Malaysian politician who has served as Member of the Selangor State Legislative Assembly (MLA) for Sabak since May 2018. He is a member of the People's Justice Party (PKR) since February 2021 after being sacked from National Trust Party (AMANAH) on 27 July 2020 and both parties a component party of the Pakatan Harapan (PH).

Election results

References 

Living people
People from Selangor
Malaysian people of Malay descent
Malaysian Muslims
National Trust Party (Malaysia) politicians
People's Justice Party (Malaysia) politicians
Members of the Selangor State Legislative Assembly
Selangor state executive councillors
21st-century Malaysian politicians
Year of birth missing (living people)